Barbara of Brandenburg-Ansbach-Kulmbach (24 September 1495 in Ansbach – 23 September 1552 in Karlovy Vary) was a princess of Brandenburg-Ansbach by birth and marriage Landgravine of Leuchtenberg.

Life 
Barbara was a daughter of Margrave Frederick the Elder of Brandenburg-Ansbach and Bayreuth (1460-1536) from his marriage to Sophia Jagiellon (1464-1512), daughter of King Casimir IV Jagiello of Poland.

She married on 29 September 1527 at the Plassenburg to Landgrave George III of Leuchtenberg (1502-1555).

In 1549, she apologized in writing to her many relatives, because her son had married the very wealthy Matilda de la Marck-Arenberg, without consulting most of her relatives. The marriage had been mediated by her brother Albert and was instrumental in restoring the financial health of the Landgraviate.

Barbara died in 1552 and was buried in the Church of the Assumption in Pfreimd.  A red marble grave place with her coat of arms can be found in front of the altar.

Issue
From her marriage, Barbara had the following children:
 George IV (d. 1553)
 Louis Henry (1529-1567), Landgrave of Leuchtenberg
 married in 1549 to Countess Matilda de la Marck-Arenberg (1530-1603)
 Elisabeth (1537/8-1579)
 married in 1559 to Count John VI of Nassau-Dillenburg (1536-1606)
 Barbara

References 
 Johann Baptist Brenner: Die Landgrafen von Leuchtenberg historisch genealogisch erläutert, an der Tauber, L.M. Beck, 1834, p. 57 ff

Footnotes and references 

House of Hohenzollern
1495 births
1552 deaths
Landgravines of Germany
16th-century German people
Daughters of monarchs